Kevin J. Boyle (born February 7, 1980) is an American  politician serving as a member of the Pennsylvania House of Representatives and current minority Chairman of the PA House State Government Committee. He is the state Representative from Pennsylvania House District 172, which covers parts of Northeast Philadelphia. Boyle was elected to the House of Representatives in November 2010 when he ran against 32-year incumbent and former Speaker of the Pennsylvania House John Perzel. Boyle is the younger brother of United States Representative Brendan F. Boyle and together they are the only set of brothers to serve simultaneously in Pennsylvania's House of Representatives in its 300-year history.

Early life
Boyle is the son of Francis Boyle, an Irish immigrant who came to America at age 19, and Eileen Boyle, a first generation Irish American who worked as a school crossing guard. He grew up in a row home in the Olney section of Philadelphia, where he was raised by his pro-union working-class parents. He graduated from Cardinal Dougherty High School
  in 1998 and graduated with honors from LaSalle University in 2002, where he received his B.A. in Political Science. He went on to earn a master's degree Harvard University. While at Harvard University where he earned his master's degree in Education, Boyle researched urban education issues, school funding streams, and strategies to expand access to higher education. Much of his research was included in the "Reach Scholarship" bill that his brother, Rep. Brendan Boyle, and then-Rep. Tony Payton introduced in the House in 2009. The goal of the legislation was to provide all Pennsylvania students who demonstrate academic excellence with the opportunity to attend college for free.

After graduating from Harvard, Boyle worked as an advocate for the Alliance for Strong Families and Communities, the nation's second-largest association for family service organizations in Washington, D.C.

Political career
Boyle began his involvement in Philadelphia politics by serving as campaign manager for older brother Brendan's campaigns for the state legislature. In 2007, Kevin became Legislative Director to City Councilman Bill Greenlee, a role Boyle held until 2010 when he stepped down from the job to run his own race for State Representative. Boyle served as Philadelphia Councilman Bill Greenlee's legislative director for three years and helped write some of the city's most impactful new laws. He also worked directly with Councilman Bill Greenlee on the ban prohibiting driving while operating a hand-held cell phone or other electronic devices.

In 2010, Boyle entered a three-way Democratic Primary in the 172nd state legislative district. The other two candidates were Democratic activist Tim Kearney and school teacher and community activist, Daniel Collins.  He accused Collins younger sister of submitting forged signatures to have his name on the ballot. Boyle’s accusations were unfounded against Lauren Collins, who at that time was 8 months pregnant. Boyle finished first, beating both of his opponents by 30-point margins. In the general election, he faced former Speaker of the House John Perzel, who was seeking re-election despite his involvement in the "Bonusgate" scandal. Boyle won the election against Perzel, capturing 53.8% to Perzel's 46.1%. It was a significant upset that bucked the strong Republican winds blowing in 2010. Boyle was sworn in as the Representative from the 172nd PA House district in January 2011.

In 2012, Boyle was challenged in the Democratic Primary. His opponent was once again Daniel Collins, who was endorsed by the Philadelphia FOP and many other city unions. Boyle again defeated Collins, winning 66% of the vote to Collins' 34%. In the general election, Boyle faced Republican Al Taubenberger. Boyle easily won re-election, defeating Taubenberger 68% to 32%. He has been re-elected by an overwhelming majority of voters in each election since.

In 2019, Boyle was appointed the minority Chairperson of the House State Government committee.

Boyle introduced legislation limiting the size of firearm magazines one may carry or sell, as well as for background checks for those who sell firearms. He is the prime sponsor on legislation that would expand the state’s Hate Crimes Law, so that it would include protections for the LGBTQ community. More recently, Boyle’s legislation to give emergency vehicle designation to Philadelphia Prison System Transport Units was signed into law by the governor.

In the 2019-2020 session, Boyle succeeded as House State Government Committee Chairperson in working across the aisle to pass much-needed election related reforms.

In 2020, Boyle has worked as Chairperson of the House State Government Committee to prevent the Republican House and Senate majority from prematurely ending COVID-19 related health and safety measures, and to require CDC and Department of Health guidelines be instituted to protect workers and citizens.

In 2021 in an interview with a Northern Irish newspaper Boyle refused to condemn all sectarian terrorist attacks in Northern Ireland.

Personal
The Philadelphia Daily News selected Kevin for its list of rising political stars within Philadelphia. Kevin's brother, Brendan, was also selected for the list. In 2012 the Community College of Philadelphia awarded Kevin for his community leadership.

Kevin and his wife, Caitlyn, live in the Fox Chase neighborhood of Philadelphia. Boyle is active in local civic organizations throughout Northeast Philadelphia.

On September 25, 2021, he was arrested and charged with harassment and violation of a protection from abuse order that was filed by his wife.

References

External links
Ballotpedia

1980 births
Living people
Democratic Party members of the Pennsylvania House of Representatives
Harvard Graduate School of Education alumni
Politicians from Philadelphia
American people of Irish descent
21st-century American politicians
La Salle University alumni